Axman is a surname. Notable people with the surname include:

 Dick Axman (1891–1969), American sports publicist, sportswriter, magazine creator and magazine editor
 Steve Axman (born 1947), American football coach

See also
AxMan, an ActiveX fuzzing engine
Axmann